Glyphipterix chrysoplanetis is a moth of the family Glyphipterigidae. It is known from Australia, including New South Wales, Queensland and Victoria.
 
The wingspan is about 20 mm. Adults have forewings that are black with two white bands. The hindwings are plain brown.

References

Glyphipterigidae
Moths described in 1880
Moths of Australia